The 5th Asian Beach Games was held in Da Nang, Vietnam. It was the second time for Vietnam to host an Asian multi-sports event, after Hanoi held the 2009 Asian Indoor Games. This was only the first time that an event was not held in Hanoi.

Logo

The Games' logo is designed to simulate the waves and sand, as well as the healthy and active athletes participating in the Games.

With the power of sports, all parts of the logo rise up to form a large V shape (which means "Vietnam", "Victory" or the fifth Roman numeral which is read as "V") which confirms the role of the host countries, highlighting the spirit of competition as well as the aspirations of the athletes to win.

The combination of sea and sand waved together reflects the strength and strong wills of the Vietnamese, carries a friendly and welcoming message to all athletes and represents the solidarity and friendship of Asia.

Mascot

The mascot of the games is a swiftlet named Chim Yen. Special characteristic of the southern central coastal region of Vietnam is famous for bird nest - a product of high economic value in general and a specialty of Da Nang in particular.

The mascot is a stylized little boy with funny hair on the head, a small V-shaped tail (a characteristic of oats), holding a lit torch represents the spirit of unity, peace and health of human life. The sun of the Olympic Council of Asia and on the traditional wave of mascot costumes symbolizing the Asian Beach Games. The colors used for the mascot is blue, red, black and gold representing the blue sea water, golden sand and feathers of birds.

Venues

Sports

 
 Aquatics

Calendar

Participating nations 
41 out of the 45 Asian countries took part. Palestine, Yemen, North Korea, and Saudi Arabia did not compete, while Kuwait competed as Independent Olympic Athletes due to suspension for political interference. Below is a list of all the participating NOCs; the number of competitors per delegation is indicated in brackets.

Medal table

Sponsors
 Football Thai Factory Sporting Goods Co, Ltd.
 Bao Viet Insurance Company

References

External links

Official website

 
2016
2016 in Vietnamese sport
Beach Games
2016 in multi-sport events
Multi-sport events in Vietnam
History of Da Nang
September 2016 sports events in Asia
October 2016 sports events in Asia